Panama competed at the 1948 Summer Olympics in London, England, returning to the Olympic Games for the first time since 1928.  Panama won its first-ever Olympic medals at these Games, and did not win another Olympic medal until Irving Saladino won gold at the 2008 Summer Olympics.

Medalists

Athletics

Key
Note–Ranks given for track events are within the athlete's heat only
Q = Qualified for the next round
q = Qualified for the next round as a fastest loser or, in field events, by position without achieving the qualifying target
NR = National record
N/A = Round not applicable for the event
Bye = Athlete not required to compete in round
NP = Not placed

Men
Track & road events

References
Official Olympic Reports
International Olympic Committee results database

Nations at the 1948 Summer Olympics
1948
1948 in Panama